Maria Rita (born 9 September 1977, São Paulo) is a Brazilian singer. Born Maria Rita Camargo Mariano, she is the daughter of famed pianist/arranger César Camargo Mariano and the late Brazilian singing legend Elis Regina and sister to Pedro Mariano and music producer João Marcelo Bôscoli. Her namesake is family friend and famed Brazilian rock legend Rita Lee. She studied at New York University, and worked as a journalist at a magazine for adolescents.

Career

Maria Rita began singing professionally at the age of 24, although she had wanted to sing since she was 14. Her first CD, Maria Rita, launched her career symbolically, with the first cut on her first album, A Festa (The Party), being written by Milton Nascimento, the legendary Brazilian singer-songwriter whose career was launched by Maria Rita's mother, Elis Regina, when she began to sing his songs to the national Brazilian audience. The CD went platinum and was a hit worldwide, making her an international star. She developed her own jazzy vocal style, with singers like Ella Fitzgerald as her model. For her 2013 album Redescobrir she was finally persuaded to perform and record songs her mother had sung.

She won the 2004 Latin Grammy Awards for Best New Artist in the General Field, Best Song in Portuguese ("A festa") and her debut album Maria Rita won the Best MPB (Musica Popular Brasileira) Album award for that year. The world hit that "Segundo" turned out to be, granted her in 2006, two additional Grammys Latinos – Best MPB Album and Best Brazilian Song with "Caminho das Águas" authored by Rodrigo Maranhão – and over 50 shows abroad, with full public and reviews acceptance in the Montreux Jazz Festival, North Sea Jazz Festival, Irving Plaza (NY), San Francisco Jazz Festival, among others.

Maria Rita was nominated for the BBC Radio 3 Awards for World Music in 2008. On 28 June 2008, she performed in London for the first time, with a production by Tuba Productions and JungleDrums Magazine.

Discography
Studio Albums

Live Albums

Video Albums

Collected

Singles

As guest
 1979 Realce, Gilberto Gil
 1990 Made in Coracao, Toquinho/Sadao Watanabe
 2003 Pietá, Milton Nascimento
 2004 Chico Rey & Paraná Vol. 14, Chico Rey
 2005 Coisas de Novela, Fabio Bartoleto
 2005 Marcas de Batom, As Leoas
 2006 12 Segundos de Oscuridad, Jorge Drexler
 2007 Outro Rio, Ricardo Silveira
 2010 BandaDois, Gilberto Gil
 2010 Entren Los Que Quieran, Calle 13
 2016 Alma Brasileira, Diogo Nogueira

Awards and nominations
Latin Grammy Award

|-
| rowspan=4|2004
| "A Festa"
| Record of the Year
| 
|-
| rowspan=2| Maria Rita
| Album of the Year
| 
|-
| Best MPB Album
| 
|-
| Maria Rita
| Best New Artist
| 
|-
| rowspan=2| 2006
| Segundo
| Best MPB Album
| 
|-
| Maria Rita
| Producer of the Year
| 
|-
| 2008
| Samba Meu1
| Best Samba/Pagode Album
| 
|-
| 2011
| "Latinoamérica" (as a feature artist)
| Record of the Year
| 
|-
| 2012
| Elo
| Best MPB Album
| 
|-
| 2013
|Redescobrir – Ao Vivo
| Best MPB Album
| 
|-
| 2014
| Coração a Batucar
| Best Samba/Pagode Album
| 
|-
|}

Prêmio Multishow de Música Brasileira

1Tied with Paulinho da Viola for MTV Unplugged.

References

This article incorporates material translated from the Maria Rita article on the Portuguese language Wikipedia.

External links
Maria Rita – Official Website
Report on 2004 Latin Grammy awards – enter Maria Rita for search
National Public Radio Interview
NPR report on 2004 Latin Grammy winners
 A french site about brazilian music

1977 births
Living people
Brazilian people of Portuguese descent
Latin Grammy Award for Best New Artist
Música Popular Brasileira singers
Singers from São Paulo
Warner Music Latina artists
Latin Grammy Award winners
21st-century Brazilian singers
21st-century Brazilian women singers
Women in Latin music